Kjellström is a Swedish surname. Notable people with the surname include:

Björn Kjellström (1910–1995), Swedish orienteer
Erik Kjellström (1904–1956), Swedish hurdler
Jan Kjellström (1940–1967), Swedish orienteer

Swedish-language surnames